Pakistan is home to many natural and man-made lakes and reservoirs. The largest lake in Pakistan is the Manchar Lake.

A recent Google map analysis revealed more than 500 lakes in northern Pakistan (mainly Gilgit-Baltistan and Chitral region), many of these lakes are still nameless and even undiscovered to even local population.

Natural lakes

Gilgit-Baltistan

Azad Kashmir,  Punjab, KPK, Sindh and Balochistan

Artificial lakes and reservoirs

See also 

Tourism in Pakistan
List of waterfalls of Pakistan
List of hill stations of Pakistan
List of valleys in Pakistan
Deserts of Pakistan
Provinces of Pakistan

Notes

External links 
 List of lakes in Pakistan at 
 Lakes in Pakistan

Pakistan
Lakes
Lakes